11th Anniversary Show was the 11th ROH Anniversary Show professional wrestling Internet pay-per-view (iPPV) event produced by Ring of Honor (ROH). It took place on March 2, 2013, at the Frontier Fieldhouse in Chicago Ridge, Illinois.

Storylines
The 11th Anniversary Show featured professional wrestling matches, which involved different wrestlers from pre-existing scripted feuds, plots, and storylines that played out on ROH's television programs. Wrestlers portrayed villains or heroes as they followed a series of events that built tension and culminated in a wrestling match or series of matches.

Results

References

External links
ROHwrestling.com (official website)

Ring of Honor pay-per-view events
Professional wrestling in the Chicago metropolitan area
2010s in Chicago
2013 in Illinois
Events in Chicago
11
March 2013 events in the United States
2013 Ring of Honor pay-per-view events